St. John's Lough, also known as St. John's Lake, is an irregularly shaped freshwater lake located in south County Leitrim, in northwest of Ireland. The lake forms part of the wider Shannon–Erne Waterway tourist attraction. 
The ecology of John's Lough, and the Shannon-system, is threatened by pollution and invasive species such as curly waterweed, zebra mussel, and freshwater clam.

Etymology
Named after , meaning "John the Baptist", the lake is therefore named "the lake of John".

Geography
The "" connects the Ballinamore canal and northern lake portion to the central John's lough, and the "" connects the central lough to the southern lough. The catchment area comprises Forestry (2%), pasture (55%), and other agriculture (43%), according to CORINE data.

Ecology
Fish present in John's Lough include "roach-bream hybrids", Roach, Perch, Bream (1-2lbs), and Pike. The pike population is the "native Irish strain" ( meaning 'Irish Pike') not the other European Pike strain ( meaning 'strange or foreign fish'). The water quality was reported to be satisfactory  with a mesotrophic rating.

Repeated instances of significant illegal dumping and littering has been reported in recent years.

Ancient lake dwellers

Four ancient crannogs were reported at St. John's Lough. The crannogs were probably occupied during at least the 13th or the early 14th century, and lands surrounding John's Lough were covered by woodland during the Middle Ages.

Heritage

Museum artefacts
The following archaeological artefacts were recovered at Saint John's Lough in the 19th century, and now preserved at the Royal Irish Academy museum, or at the National Museum of Ireland-
 Three silver coins of the reigns of Edward I or Edward II, and Edward III found on a Crannog.
 Bronze pin, and Short bronze sword, found at  near John's Lough.

Ancient church
According to the Annals of the Four Masters an ancient church standing on the northern shore of Saint John's Lough (nearby where the Yellow River ["An Gheirgthigh"] enters the Lough at ) was destroyed in 1244AD.

 "".

Human settlements
The primary human settlements around St John's lough is Fenagh village and Ballinamore town.

See also
List of loughs in Ireland

References and notes

Notes

Citations

Primary sources

Secondary sources

External links

Lakes of County Leitrim